Sonia Annabel Elliot ( Shand; born 2 February 1949) is a British interior designer and antiques dealer. She is the mother of British Conservative politician Ben Elliot, who served as the Co-Chairman of the Conservative Party, and sister of Queen Camilla.

Personal life
Elliot is the daughter of Major Bruce Shand (1917–2006) and his wife, Rosalind Cubitt (1921–1994), daughter of the 3rd Baron Ashcombe and Sonia Rosemary Keppel. Her elder sister is Queen Camilla, and her brother was travel writer Mark Shand (1951–2014). Elliot went to Florence, Italy, to study fine art.

On 27 April 1972, at the age of 23, she married Simon Elliot, a Dorset landowner and son of Air Chief Marshal Sir William Elliot and Rosemary Chancellor. They have three children: Ben, (the current Co-Chairman of the Conservative Party, born 1975); Alice (born 1977); and Catherine (born 1981).

Career
Elliot is the founder of Annabel Elliot Interior design and antiques, which is based in Dorset. The shop has been running for 30 years. She is also the co-founder of Gillingham-based antiques and interiors emporium Talisman. Her daughter Alice and her husband Luke Irwin are also interior designers and antiques dealers.
 
Elliot has been employed by her brother-in-law Prince Charles. She is the chief interior designer of his estates. She first began renovating the Duchy of Cornwall estates. She has designed the interior of 12 Duchy of Cornwalls cottages on the Isles of Scilly, holiday cottages at Restormel Castle and has also performed work on Prince Charles's estate Llwynywermod in Wales. In 2011, Elliot renovated Bovey Castle Hotel in Devon and received recognition and positive feedback as an interior designer. Bovey Castle Hotel made the 2011 Gold List as one of the world's best places to stay. The same year she helped furnish the new sustainable building of The Duchy Nursery in Lostwithiel. Elliot furnished Dumfries Lodge House in Ayrshire, Scotland which was opened for business by Prince Charles in 2012. Elliot also furnished the Highgrove House Shops, which sells products for home and garden. In 2016, Elliot helped furnish 20 bedrooms at the Duchess of Cornwall Inn pub at Poundbury village.

In 2014,  The Daily Telegraph ranked Elliot as the fifth most influential female interior designer in Britain.

Charity work
Elliot was a patron of British Association for Adoption and Fostering (BAAF) from 2005; it closed in 2015. She cited her mother Rosalind, who worked for an adoption agency, for influencing her to support the charity. She is also a life member and patron of the Elephant Family, of which her brother Mark was chairman until his death in 2014.

References

External links
Official website

Living people
1949 births
British debutantes
Annabel
Cubitt family
Annabel
Annabel
People from Dorset
English interior designers
Antiques experts